Myanmymar is an extinct genus of fairyfly preserved in Burmese amber from Myanmar. It has only one species, Myanmymar aresconoides. It is dated to the earliest part of the Cenomanian stage of the Late Cretaceous, around 99 million years old. As of 2011, it is the oldest known fossil mymarid.

Discovery and geologic time range
Myanmymar aresconoides was described by John T. Huber and George Poinar Jr. from a specimen of a female embedded in Burmese amber. The amber was recovered in 2001 from the Noije Bum 2001 Summit Site, a fossil amber mine in Hukawng Valley, Kachin State of Myanmar. The site is dated to the Albian-Cenomanian (97 to 110 million years ago) of the Early Cretaceous epoch. As of 2011, this makes Myanmymar aresconoides the oldest known fossil mymarid recovered.

Taxonomy
Myanmymar aresconoides is the only species belonging to the genus Myanmymar. It belongs to the family of fairyflies Mymaridae of the chalcid wasp superfamily Chalcidoidea.

The generic name Myanmymar is derived from a euphonious combination of "Myanmar" and Greek μῶμος (mōmos, "spot" or "blot"). The specific name means "resembling Arescon", from Arescon (an extant genus of fairyfly) and Greek -εἶδος (eidos, "like", "resembling").

Description

Like other fairyflies, M. aresconoides is a tiny wasp. The entire body length of the specimen is about half a millimeter, . The antennae have eight segments in the funicle and two on club-like tip (clava). The maxillary palps have three segments.

It has narrow forewings, with wing venation extending up to two-thirds of the length and a rounded lobe at the base. On the margins are numerous long bristle-like projections (marginal setae), the longest of which is about twice the greatest width of the wing. The hindwings are also narrow with parallel sides. Their marginal setae are about seven times the width of the wing. Both wings do not possess microtrichia (small irregularly scattered hairs), except for two sparse rows beyond the venation of the forewings.

The legs have long tarsi with five segments. The tibia is not clearly visible but is assumed to be about the same length as the tarsi.

As the specific name suggests, M. aresconoides is very similar to the extant genus Arescon in wing shape and venation. Only three other modern mymarid genera (Boudiennyia, Eustochomorpha, and Borneomymar) share all the M. aresconoides characteristics of having forewing venation longer than half the wing length, five segments on the tarsi, and eight segments on the funicles. M. aresconoides is also unique among fairyflies in having three distinct segments on the palpi. In contrast, all modern mymarids have unsegmented palpi.

Another specimen of a possible male of the species was also discovered. However, it is impossible to ascertain if they belong to the same species due to the poor condition of the second specimen.

See also

Prehistoric insects
Paleoentomology

References

External links
Myanmymar aresconoides on Species-ID

Mymaridae
Monotypic Hymenoptera genera
Cretaceous insects
Cretaceous insects of Asia
Fossil taxa described in 2011
Burmese amber
Fossils of Myanmar